Gyllene Skivan (Golden Disc) is an annual jazz award given by Orkesterjournalen (OJ), the oldest jazz magazine in Sweden which was established in 1933.
OJ established  the Gyllene Skivan award in 1954. The Swedish tenor saxophonist, Bernt Rosengren, is the only person to have won the award five times.

Winners Of The Gyllene Skivan Awards Since 1954
1954 Lars Gullin: Dannys dream - Metronome
1955 Arne Domnérus: Rockin’ chair – HMV
1956 Hacke Björksten: On the Alamo – Metronome
1957 Bengt Hallberg: Dinah m fl – Philips
1958 Harry Arnold: Quincy’s home again – Metronome
1959 Åke Persson: Quincy – here we come – Metronome
1960 Jan Johansson: Mäster Johansgatan 12 – Megafon
1961 Jan Johansson: 8 bitar Johansson – Megafon
1962 Bengt-Arne Wallin: Old folklore in swedish modern – Dux
1963 Eje Thelin: So far – Columbia
1964 Lars Gullin: Portrait of my pals – Columbia
1965 Bernt Rosengren: Stockholm dues – Columbia
1966 Börje Fredriksson: Intervall – Columbia
1967 Arne Domnérus: Mobil – Megafon
1968/69 (slogs ihop pga för få inspelningar ’68)  Bernt Rosengren: Improvisationer – SJR
1970 Jan Allan: Jan Allan ’70 – MCA
1971 Bjarne Nerem: How long has this been going on – Odeon
1972 Nils "Nisse" Sandström: The painter – Odeon
1973 Putte Wickman: Happy new year – Odeon
1974 Bernt Rosengren: Notes from the underground – Harvest
1975 Eje Thelin: Eje Thelin – Caprice
1976 Nannie Porres: Närbild – EMI
1977 Rune Gustafsson: Move – Sonet
1978 Arne Domnérus & Bengt Hallberg: Duets for Duke – Sonet
1979 Nils Lindberg: Saxes galore – Bluebell
1980 Jazz Incorporated: Live at Fasching – Caprice
1981 Lars Sjösten: Select notes – Caprice
1982 Jazz Incorporated: Walkin’ on – Dragon
1983 Christer Boustedt: Plays Thelonious Monk – Dragon
1984 Tolvan Big Band: Montreux and more – Dragon
1985 Rolf Ericson: Stockholm sweetnin’ – Dragon
1986 Krister Andersson: Krister Andersson and friends – Dragon
1987 Bertil Löfgren: First time – Dragon
1988 Åke Johansson Trio: Encore – Dragon
1989 Lars Sjösten kvartett: Roots and relations – Dragon
1990 Joakim Milder: Still in motion – Dragon
1991 Summit Meeting: Full of life – Dragon
1992 Peter Gullin: Tenderness – Dragon
1993 Krister Andersson: About time – Flash Music
1994 Bosse Broberg/Red Mitchell: West of the moon – Dragon
1995 Anders Bergcrantz: In this together – Dragon
1996 Bobo Stenson: Reflections – ECM
1997 Jan Lundgren Trio: Swedish standards – Sittel
1998 Per "Texas" Johansson: Alla mina kompisar – Kaza
1999 Arne Domnérus & Bernt Rosengren: Face to face – Dragon
2000 Patrik Boman: Seven Piece Machine – Arietta
2001 Magnus Lindgren: Paradise open – Caprice
2002 Per Henrik Wallin: Tiveden – Phono Suecia
2003 Esbjörn Svensson: Seven days of falling – Superstudio Gul
2004 Peter Asplund: Lochiel’s warning – Prophone
2005 Bobo Stenson: Goodbye – ECM
2006 Esbjörn Svensson Trio: Tuesday Wonderland –	ACT
2007 Anders Bergcrantz: About Time – Stunt Records
2008 Esbjörn Svensson Trio: Leocucyte – ACT
2009 Bernt Rosengren: I'm Flying –	PB7
2010 Peter Asplund: Peter Asplund meets Bernstein –	Prophone
2011 Tonbruket: Dig It to the End –	ACT
2012 Bobo Stenson: Indicum –	ECM/Naxos
2013 Fire! Orchestra: Exit –	 Rune Grammofon
2014 Daniel Karlsson: Fusion for Fish –	Brus & Knaster/ Isabella Lundgren: Somehow Life Got in the Way –	Ladybird
2015 Per "Texas" Johansson: De långa rulltrapporna i Flemingsberg –	 Moserobie
2016 Ellen Andersson Quartet: I'll be Seeing You – Prophone
2017 Lina Nyberg: Terrestrial – Hoob
2018 Bobo Stenson: Contra La Indecisión –  ECM
2019 Per "Texas" Johansson: Stråk på himlen och stora hus – Moserobie

References

External links 
 Official Orkester Journal Site

1954 establishments in Sweden
Awards established in 1954
Jazz awards
Swedish music awards
Swedish music